Taiwanese singer Jolin Tsai has recorded 208 songs for 15 studio albums, seven live albums, and 11 compilation albums, and others. In 1999, she released her debut studio album, 1019. From then on, she released a series of successful albums, including the Golden Melody Award winners Dancing Diva (2006), Muse (2012), Play (2014), and Ugly Beauty (2018). Tsai has released an array of successful songs including the Hit FM Top 100 top 10 hits, including "Say Love You", "It's Love", "Sky", "Pretence", "Marry Me Today", "Sun Will Never Set", "I Won't Last a Day Without You", "Butterfly", "Honey Trap", "The Great Artist", "Play", "The Third Person and I", "Ugly Beauty", and "Stars Align". Tsai has collaborated with a number of songwriters throughout her career to write songs, including "The Spirit of Knight", "The Starter", "Repeated Note", "The Prologue", "Beast", "I'm Not Yours", "Womxnly", and "Sweet Guilty Pleasure".

She has also recorded songs for film and television soundtracks, starting in 2001 with the release of the Mandarin version of "Where the Dream Takes You" for the American animated film, Atlantis: The Lost Empire (2001). She followed it with songs including "Angel of Love", "Darkness", and "Sweetie" for the Hong Kong film, Why Me, Sweetie?! (2003), as well as "Warriors in Peace" for the Chinese film, Warriors of Heaven and Earth (2003). In 2014, Tsai recorded the theme song named "Kaleidoscope" for the Chinese film, Tiny Times 3. In 2017, she recorded the theme song named "On Happiness Road" for the Taiwanese animated film under the same title and the theme song named "Stand Up" for the Chinese film, Monster Hunt 2 (2018). In 2020, she recorded the songs "Who Am I", "Opposite", and "Turn Back Time" for the Chinese series, The Wolf (2020). Her most recent song recorded for a film was "Untitled" for the Taiwanese film, Marry My Dead Body (2023).

Songs

Unreleased songs 

 "Cherry Cherry" is a song supposedly written by Adam Hsu. Tsai only performed a live version of this song once on Kiki Hu's concert in Taipei in 2002.
 "Stand Up for Love", a Mandarin version of Destiny's Child's song under the same title. The song was a promotional song of 2005 World Children's Day and used in conjunction with Ronald McDonald House Charities in order to raise awareness of the day. Tsai performed a live version of this song on Show Lo's concert in Taipei in 2005 for the first time, and she later performed on three Taipei dates of her Dancing Forever World Tour in 2006.
 "Little Child" is a song written by Stone, Ashin, and Chen Mo and tailored for Tsai. Tsai performed a live version of this song on 2013 Summer Super Slippa in Taipei for the first time. The song later became the theme song of the 2013 Taiwanese film, Endless Nights in Aurora, and recorded by Fish Leong. Tsai also performed the song on both Zhengzhou and Chengdu dates of her Play World Tour in 2016 and Double Play Fan Meeting in Taipei in 2018.

References

External links 
 

Lists of songs by recording artists